"If You Can Live with It (I Can Live Without It)" is a song written and recorded by American country singer-songwriter Bill Anderson. It was released as a single in 1973 via MCA Records and became a major hit the same year.

Background and release
"If You Can Live With It (I Can Live Without It)" was recorded on December 11, 1972, at the Bradley Studio, located in Nashville, Tennessee. The sessions were produced by Owen Bradley, who would serve as Anderson's producer through most of years with Decca Records. The album's B-side track was recorded during the same session.

"If You Can Live with It" was released as a single by MCA Records in January 1973. It was Anderson's first single release on MCA after his previous label (Decca Records) switched names. The song spent 14 weeks on the Billboard Hot Country Singles before reaching number two in May 1973. In Canada, the single reached number two on the RPM Country Songs chart. It was released on his 1973 studio album, Bill.

Track listings
7" vinyl single
 "if You Can Live with It (I Can Live Without It)" – 2:43
 "(All Together Now) Let's Fall Apart" – 2:20

Chart performance

References

1973 singles
1973 songs
Bill Anderson (singer) songs
MCA Records singles
Song recordings produced by Owen Bradley
Songs written by Bill Anderson (singer)